Don Sirisena (born 1934 – died 1986 as දොන් සිරිසේන) [Sinhala]), was an actor in Sri Lankan cinema and theater. One of the most popular comedy artists ever in Sri Lankan film history, Sirisena had a career spanned about three decades acted more than 150 films.

Career
Sirisena started cinema career in 1964 with the film Sobana Sitha. Since then, he continued act in more than 150 films particularly as the supporting comedian with other popular comedy actors of his era such as Freddie Silva, B. S. Perera and Wimal Kumara de Costa. His final cinema appearance came through 1991 film Ali Baba Saha Horu Hathaliha, five years after his death.

Sirisena was married to elder sister of popular actress Damitha Saluwadana. Damitha died on 27 November 2015 at the age of 67.

Filmography

References

External links
 අගැයුමක් නැති මිනිස්සු

1934 births
1986 deaths
Sri Lankan male film actors
Sinhalese male actors
Sri Lankan comedians
Sri Lankan male stage actors